The Republic of the Congo (Brazzaville) and the Democratic Republic of the Congo (Kinshasa) share the basin of the Congo River (after which both nations are named). The two nations' capital cities, Brazzaville and Kinshasa, are the two closest capital cities on Earth after Rome and Vatican City (a micro-city state enclaved within the former), facing each other on both sides of the Congo  River. As Francophone nations formerly ruled by France and Belgium, respectively, both Congos are member states of La Francophonie.

History
The two countries were involved in diplomatic controversy (LICOPA affair) in August of 1971 when DR Congo (then Zaire) declared the Republic of Congo's charge d'affaires to be a persona non grata. Despite of the incident, relations between the two countries were not canceled and general Mobutu reiterated his commitment to brotherly relations in Central Africa. On 22 August that same year, PR Congo's court sentenced LICOPA member Ando Ibarra to three years in prison and 10 years of expulsion from the country due to "violation of external security and spread of fake news".

References

 
Congo, Republic of the
Congo, Democratic Republic of the